Daraganj is a prominent suburb and a landmark in the city of Prayagraj. It is the oldest suburb of Prayag at the bank of celestial river Ganges and not far from Triveni Sangam - the confluence of three sacred rivers: the Ganges and Yamuna, and the third  invisible river Saraswati. Thus, Daraganj is essentially a theoretical and philosophical reference point of city now called Prayagraj.

Location
Situated on the bank of the river Ganges, Daraganj is cosmopolitan in the sense that a significant mix of Punjabi, Bengali , Marathi , Tamil, Telugu, Kannad and Gujarati communities, apart from natives thrive within a small area. Set up in a small village setting, Daraganj is a mesh of narrow lanes without any road signs. However, all  of these lanes inevitably lead to the main road. This is the last bathing Ghat on the river Ganges before it joins the river Yamuna.
The name "Daraganj" is presumably derived from the word "Dharaganj" meaning the place of the stream or current of water. Legend also has an alternative explanation that it is named after "Dara Shikoh", the elder brother of Mughal king Aurangjeb who was subsequently killed by Aurangjeb in the power struggle for the throne. Dara Shikoh was known to have studied Hindu Scriptures and translated many of the Upanishads and Puranas into Persian. Presumably, that translation work had taken place at Daraganj.

Religious significance
Prayagraj is the king of all pilgrimage centers because Lord Brahma conducted first (pra) ten yajnas (yag) there at Dashaswamedh Ghat also located in Daraganj. Considering that Lord Brahma lives one hundred celestial years- equivalent to 311 trillion 40 billion earth years, and we are currently in fifty-fifth year of Brahma, and assuming that Brahma performed first ten Yajnas when he was twenty years of age, it is established that it happened 110 trillion years ago. "Lord Brahmā's day, consisting of his 12 hours, lasts 4 billion 320 million years, and his night is of the same duration." (Śrīmad Bhāgavatam 12.8.2-5) 

Lord Rama visited Prayag twice. The first stay was at Bharadwaj Ashram which still exists near University of Allahabad.
Lord Rama, Sita and Lakshmana visited the Veni Madhav Temple during their fourteen-year-long exile and it was at Daraganj where "Nishad", the king of boatsmen, helped them cross the Ganges river. After killing Ravana,the "Pushpak Viman" carrying Lord Rama, Lakshman and Hanuman and the victorious army  of monkeys and bears stopped over at Prayag again  where Lord Rama and Lakshman did "prayashchit" for having killed  Brahmanas. This happened 1.7 million years ago in Treta Yuga. NASA photographs confirm the  bridge made of boulders  between Sri Lanka and India and predict it to be 1.7 million years old.
The famous debate between Shankaracharya and Mandan Mishra and his learned wife Bharati Mishra took place in 700 AD- Bharati Mishra was the judge. When the couple lost the philosophical debate and was about to enter alive in the pyre- according to "rules of engagement" in those days- Shankaracharya granted them pardon and right to live, and preach Vedic knowledge rather than Buddhism.

About 500 years ago, Lord Chaitanya preached the essential principals of devotion to Rupa Goswami for ten days at Dashaswamedh Ghat. There is a plaque bearing the historic marking "Rupa Shikshsthali" at Dashaswamedh Ghat. Not far is another plaque bearing the foot prints of Chaitanya Mahaprabhu at Veni Madhava Temple, where Lord Chaitanya used to sing and dance every day. Lord Chaitanya stayed for three nights at "Naag Vasuki " Mandir.
About 500 years ago, Mirabai visited Daraganj and composed famous devotional poem "chalo man Ganga Yamuna teer".
In 483 AD, Moghul Emperor Akbar named Prayag as Ilahabad - City of God- also called Prayagraj. Founder of Arya Samaj Dayanand Saraswati too stayed at " Naag Vasuki " Mandir for three nights.

It is an important religious center with hundreds of Hindu temples, such as Dashaswamedh Temple, Veni-Madhav Temple, Naag-Vasuki Temple,"Bhishma Shaiya", Bade Hanumaanji Temple, and Sri Jagannath Temple. Thus, it is considered inappropriate to skip the visit to Dashaswamedh temple after bathing in the holy river of Ganges at the Daraganj Ghat. Next to Daraganj is the "Alopi Devi Mandir", It is a temple dedicated to "Mother Sati", the wife of Lord Shiva. The story as told in Puranas suggests that the Alopi Temple was the place where the last remains of Mother Sati fell, when Shiva was sadly carrying them around the world. To bring Lord Shiva out of his mourning, Lord Vishnu threw his "Chakra" at the remains causing the remains to drop at various places on the earth. The last piece of the remains dropped at this place. Hence the place came to be known  as "Alopi" meaning disappearance (of remains).

Notable residents
 Suryakant Tripathi Nirala - Hindi poet and writer
 Ravindra Khattree - statistician

Education
It has a big Intermediate college named as Radha Raman Inter College in front of Daraganj Railway Station and behind Prayag Ghat (now renamed Prayagraj Sangam) Railway Station.
Other Colleges are Maa Saraswati Inter College, Nirala Balika Vidyalaya, Navbharti Public School, Royal House Public School, Handia Baba Inter College and Mordern Nursery Primary School (1982–2000).
Fine Classes (1998 – present), Raj Coaching (2000–2010), Akansha Coaching (2000–2012) and Shukla Classes (2003–2007) are big names in Education.

Festivals
Moreover, Daraganj is a place for  festivals. One can see a festival in every 15 days.these festivals are of native types which are celebrated mainly in daraganj and other very few places. Some of these are Vata Savitri, Ganga Dussehra, Dhendia, Bhai Duj, Parewa, Bada Ittwaar etc. Naag Panchami Mela at Naag Vasuki Temple in Daraganj is a unique festival where along with worshipping thousands of serpents, masses participate in shopping for fun and sing songs.
Dussehra of Daraganj is famous all over its vicinity. Here Ramlila committee organizes the Dussehra in which Kali dance is famous, which is carried out for three nights of Navratri.

Daraganj is the reference point for "Magh" fairs, held every year during winter and for "Kumbh Mela" fairs held every twelve years. On these occasions, an entirely new temporary town is created in the vicinity of Daraganj to serve the needs of the millions of pilgrims, with its own postoffice, bridges, police station and public services. During the "Kumbh" fairs Daraganj arguably becomes one of the most densely populated place on earth, when millions of pilgrims live within its small borders in the makeshift tents.
Daraganj has its own railways station with the same name and has another major railway terminus train station known as "PrayagRaj Sangam" earlier known as "Prayag Ghat Railway Station". The station was awarded the cleanest station award in northern India by Northern Railways.

Transport
National Highway 19 (NH 19; previously NH2)  runs through the middle of the Daraganj via Shashtri Bridge which links it to Allahabad and Varanasi.
City buses, Tourist taxis, auto rickshaws (or tempos) are available for local transport. There are also city buses service run by UPSRTC as well as private operators that connects various parts of the city. But the most convenient method of local transport inside the city is the E-rickshaw and cycle rickshaw.
Daraganj have two railway stations:-
Daraganj and Prayag Ghat Terminus (now renamed Prayagraj Sangam) facing each other although Daraganj station is at much higher level than the ground level, thereby providing the easy passage for trains to the bridge over the river Ganga.
The newly reconstructed Prayagraj Sangam railway station now makes Daraganj a more prominent within the city.

References

Neighbourhoods in Allahabad